Marc Gicquel and Nicolas Mahut won the title, by defeating their compatriots Olivier Charroin and Alexandre Renard 6–3, 6–4 in the final.

Seeds

Draw

Draw

References
 Doubles Draw

Valle d'Aosta Open - Doubles
Sport in Courmayeur